John Alexander Harman (February 29, 1824 – July 19, 1874) was a Confederate States Army officer during the American Civil War, serving as quartermaster to Stonewall Jackson in his different commands. After the general's death, he continued as quartermaster of the Second Corps, sometimes also as acting chief quartermaster of the Army of Northern Virginia.

Early life
Born in Waynesboro, Virginia, to the former Sarah Jane Garber and her husband Lewis Harman (1794-1840), his father died when he was 16 years old. His maternal grandfather, John Cunningham, had been a member of Staunton's Committee of Safety in the American Revolutionary War, as well as captain of a cavalry company in the Virginia militia. John received a private education suitable to his class. He had an elder brother Michael Garber Harman (1823-1877) and younger brothers William Henry Harman (1828-1865), Asher Waterman Harman (1830-1895) and Thomas Lewis Harman (1831-1861). His four brothers would likewise fight in the Confederate States Army, but mostly as quartermasters, and two died.  William H. Harman, a prominent local lawyer, would begin the war as a Brigadier General of the Virginia militia and helped secure the Harper's Ferry arsenal immediately after secession. However, health problems caused him to be assigned as an aide-de-camp to Brig. Gen. Edward Johnson and to command reservists in the Shenandoah Valley; he would die in Battle of Waynesboro. Their youngest brother T.L. Harman would become a Lieutenant in the Staunton Artillery of the Confederate States Army, but die in September 1861 of typhoid fever in Prince William County, Virginia.

Early career

Harman began his working life as a newspaper editor, first at the Staunton Spectator, later of the Lewisburg Observer.  During the Mexican–American War, he abandoned the press, and fought as a member of Hays' Texas Rangers in Captain Gillespie's company. After the Texas war, Harman became a butcher in Staunton. His eldest brother Michael Garber Harman ran a stage line with the help of their brother Asher Waterman Harmon, as well as a hotel in Staunton with William H. Garber. John Harmon lived in the hotel before his marriage, as did other relatives. By 1860, Michael Harman owned 41 slaves, three of them leased out to others. Meanwhile, another brother, William Henry Harman (1828-1865), a Texas war veteran, became a prominent lawyer in Staunton and the commonwealth's attorney. John Harmon became a justice of the peace, as well as an officer in the Virginia militia.

Although Augusta County was a Whig stronghold, Harman was an active Democrat, noted for his efforts in the struggle against the Know Nothings. During the 1860 election, Harman supported Stephen A. Douglas and the Northern Democratic Party, but after the election of Lincoln, he began to argue for cooperation with the seceded states.

Civil War

Harman became Stonewall Jackson's quartermaster when the general took command at Harpers Ferry in the spring of 1861, and he was commissioned as Captain, Assistant Quartermaster, PACS. General Jackson personally recruited Harman for the post of quartermaster although he was by no means a willing recruit; at the beginning of the war he wanted to go back to his business, later he would have preferred to fight as a combat officer. Nevertheless, Stonewall persuaded Harman, and General Robert E. Lee appointed him. Soon promoted to Major, Harman was well known for his efficiency as well as his profanity. Despite Jackson's appreciation of Harman's talents as supply and transport officer, the relationship between the two men was not smooth. Harman proved a critical observer of Jackson's tactical performance. After the battle of McDowell 1862, Harman wrote to his brother that, "We have been worsted by miss-management. I am more than ever satisfied of Jackson's incompetency." During Jackson's Valley Campaign, Harman received 48 hours leave because his children were sick with scarlet fever. When he came home to Staunton, he found two children dead and two seriously ill. Harman requested extension of his leave, but it was denied. When later one of the children died, he requested leave to attend the funeral, but it was again denied. Another source of friction was Harman's habitual use of profanities.

After Jackson's death, Harman served as Quartermaster to General Richard S. Ewell. Sometimes he also served as Acting Chief Quartermaster to General Lee.

Postbellum

After the war, Harman again became active in civic affairs, participating in the Valley Railroad Convention, and becoming a delegate to the Conservative Party convention. He soon, however, abandoned his previous political convictions, becoming a Republican, and working for the emancipation of the African-Americans of Virginia. In 1869, he chaired the Republican Party in Augusta County. Harman later turned down an appointment to serve on the Central Executive Committee of the Republican Party, but served in the Republican state convention of 1870. The administration rewarded his efforts with the postmastership of Staunton.

Family
Harman married his cousin Elizabeth Garber in 1849. After they built Bellefonte 1 ½ mile outside Staunton, they would have 13 children, of which five predeceased their parents.

References

Notes

Cited literature
 Castro Jr., Perry C. (1987)  A study of the leadership displayed by Lieutenant General Thomas Jonathan Jackson during the American Civil War. U.S. Army Command and General Staff College.
 Douglas, Henry Kyd (1989). I rode with Stonewall. Mockingbird Books.
 Garber Jr., Alexander M. (2014). Stonewall Jackson's Way. Staunton.
 Harman, John William (1928). Harman-Harmon Genealogy and Biography. Parsons, West Virginia.
 Krick, Robert E. L. (2003). Staff Officers in Gray. The University of North Carolina Press.
 Krick, Robert K. (1990). Stonewall Jackson at Cedar Mountain. The University of North Carolina Press.
 McPherson, James M. (1988). Battle Cry of Freedom. Oxford University Press.
 Stith, Shawn B. (1993). Foundation for victory: operations and intelligence harmoniously combine in Jackson's Shenandoah Valley campaign (1862). Naval Postgraduate School.
 Vandiver, Frank E. (1989). Mighty Stonewall. Texas A & M University Press.
 Wise, Barton H. (1899). The Life of Henry Wise. The Macmillan Company.

External links
 

1824 births
1874 deaths
People from Augusta County, Virginia
American military personnel of the Mexican–American War
People of Virginia in the American Civil War
Stonewall Brigade
Quartermasters
Confederate States Army officers